Valentina Ivanova (born 10 May 1963) is a retired female discus thrower from Russia, who competed in the discus contest at the 1996 Summer Olympics in Atlanta, Georgia. There she ended up in 24th place (58.38 metres). Ivanova set her personal best in the women's discus throw event (65.12 metres) on 2001-01-27 in Pietersburg.

International competitions

References

sports-reference

1963 births
Living people
Russian female discus throwers
Olympic female discus throwers
Olympic athletes of Russia
Athletes (track and field) at the 1996 Summer Olympics
Competitors at the 1994 Goodwill Games
Russian Athletics Championships winners
20th-century Russian women